Zen X Four is a 2005 live CD with a DVD containing most of the music videos of British band Bush. The album cover photography and band logo were originally featured on their second album, Razorblade Suitcase.

Track listing
Live songs performed at KROQ's Almost Acoustic Christmas on 18 December 1995.

References

External links
 BushZenXFour
 Bush Fansite

Bush (British band) live albums
2005 live albums
Kirtland Records live albums